The current chief of the Highland, Scottish clan, Clan Maclean is Sir Lachlan Hector Charles Maclean of Duart and Morvern Bt, CVO, Deputy Lord Lieutenant of Argyll and Bute, 28th clan chief and 12th Baronet of Morvern. The seat of the chiefs of Clan MacLean is Duart Castle on the Isle of Mull. Duart was given to Lachlan Lubanach Maclean as part of his wife's dowry.

The following is a list of the previous chiefs of the Clan Maclean.

References

Chiefs
MacLean